This is a list of laws, court cases and reports on LGBT rights in Ireland.

An act for the punishment of the vice of buggery 1634
This was an act of the Irish Parliament which copied the Buggery Act 1534 as passed by the English parliament. This act made the death penalty the punishment upon conviction. The act did not define what buggery meant but it was widely understood to mean male to male penetrative sexual acts as well as sexual acts with animals.

Offences Against the Person (Ireland) Act 1829
This act restated that buggery was to be punished by the death penalty.

Offences Against the Person Act 1861

This act updated and streamlined the criminal law of Great Britain and Ireland. It outlawed many forms of practices including 'buggery' or male-to-male penetrative sex. The punishment was life imprisonment or a jail sentence of not less than 10 years. It abolished the death penalty for such acts, which had been law up to this point.

Criminal Law Amendment Act 1885

Commonly known as the Labouchere Amendment. This act outlawed what was termed "acts of gross indecency" between men both in public and in private. The definition was vague and included intimate acts falling short of penetrative sex between two men. Male to male sex was illegal under previous law but it was very narrowly interpreted by the courts. Usually, the courts required that penetration to have occurred for 'buggery' to have taken place. This new act made it much easier to punish the intimate acts of men together. The penalty was a maximum of two years imprisonment. The Irish author and dramatist Oscar Wilde was convicted in England under this act.

Vagrancy Act 1898
This prohibited soliciting or importuning for immoral purposes. It was originally intended as a measure against male to female prostitution, however, in practice, these measures were almost solely applied to male-to-male sex acts.

Criminal Law (Amendment) Act 1912
This allowed flogging to be used as a punishment for existing crimes in regards to sexual offences.

Criminal Law Bill 1921
Proposed to extend the provision criminalising gross indecency between males to gross indecency between females. This bill was dropped due to those who felt that to even criminalise female-to-female sex acts would draw attention to these acts and publicise them. As a result, female-to-female sex acts were legal, unlike male-to-male sex acts.

Norris v. the Attorney General (1980) (High Court)
David Norris, later to become a senator for Trinity College, Dublin and presidential candidate, took the Attorney General to the High Court over the criminalisation of male-to-male sex. He argued that the law infringed on his right to privacy to have consensual sex with a man and that since the introduction of the Constitution of Ireland the law passed under British rule became repugnant to the constitution. The High Court ruled against Norris. He appealed his case to the Supreme Court.

Norris v. the Attorney General (1983) (Supreme Court)
Having lost his High Court case Norris appealed his case to the Supreme Court. The Supreme Court upheld the constitutionality of the law by a three to two verdict.

Health (Family Planning) (Amendment) Act 1985
This act legalised the manufacture, sale, and importation of condoms in Ireland. Prior to this condoms were banned under the law. The law was changed to allow condoms in order to help protect the health and lives of gay men during the AIDS crisis.

Norris v. Ireland (1988) (European Court of Human Rights)

Having lost the Supreme Court case Norris took his case to the European Court of Human Rights. The European Court struck down the law criminalising male-to-male sex on the grounds of privacy. It was held that this infringed on the right of adults to engage in acts of their own choice. Irish law was regarded as too narrow and extreme.

Regulations regarding sexual orientation in the Irish Civil Service (1988)
These regulations affected the terms and conditions of employment of civil servants. These regulations prohibited discrimination on the grounds of sexual orientation or if a person was HIV positive.

Prohibition of Incitement To Hatred Act 1989
Prohibited inciting hatred on various grounds including a person's sexual orientation. This was the first piece of legislation to actually provide some protection gays and lesbians.

Video Recordings Act 1989

This act regulates the sale and supply of video recordings. It allows the Censor to suppress videos that are likely to stir up hatred against a person or group of persons on account of their sexual orientation as well as on other grounds.

Child Care Act 1991
This act regulates the service of fostering. This act permits same-sex couples to apply jointly for fostering. This may not have been intended at the time to permit same-sex couples to foster children, however, it has since become practice to allow same-sex couple to foster.

Adoption Act 1991
Up until this act, an adoption could only be granted to a married couple living together, the natural parents of the child, a relative of the child or a widow or widower. This act allowed a person not related to the child to adopt provided the Adoption Board was satisfied that this was in the best interests of the child. This meant that a single person irrespective of their sexual orientation could adopt a child. Presumably, this was to take place in exceptional circumstances. Same-sex and opposite-sex cohabiting couples were not permitted to apply for adoption. This has since been changed by the Children and Family Relationships Act 2015.

Criminal Law (Sexual Offences) Act 1993
Decriminalised acts of male-to-male sex. This act repealed the sections of the Offences Against the Person Act 1861 on buggery over the age of 17 thereby setting an equal age of consent for same-sex or opposite-sex sexual intercourse. It also repealed as a whole the Criminal Law Amendment Act 1885, thereby abolishing 'acts of gross indecency between males' in law.

Unfair Dismissals (Amendment) Act 1993
Prohibited dismissing an employee on a number of grounds including sexual orientation.

Social Welfare (Consolidation) Act 1993

This act provided the legal basis for social welfare payments and consolidated all previous acts regarding social welfare into one act. This act allowed for some social welfare payments to be given to cohabiting opposite-sex couples. Same-sex couples were not recognised and thus were unable to apply for any social welfare payments as a couple.

Health Insurance Act 1994

This act prohibited health insurance companies from varying their premiums on the grounds of a person's sexual orientation.

Domestic Violence Act 1996
Allows for a partner in a same-sex cohabiting relationship to apply for safety order or an interim protection order but does not allow for a permanent barring order which was at the time available to married couples and opposite-sex couples. This has since been changed. See Civil Law (Miscellaneous Provisions) Act 2011 below. Also see Domestic Violence Bill 2017

Powers of Attorney Act 1996
Widened a person's right to grant power of attorney beyond their family or next of kin. A person could grant power of attorney to another person i.e. their partner where that person becomes unable to make decisions for themselves due to mental incapacity. This law has since been amended by the Assisted Decision-Making (Capacity) Act 2015.

Refugee Act 1996
Allowed refugee status to be conferred on an individual on the basis of a fear of persecution arising from their sexual orientation.

Freedom of Information Act 1997

This act allows the general public to have access to information and records kept about them by the civil service, state agencies and by private companies. The act allows information on a person's sexual orientation to be kept on record and to be shared.

Treaty of Amsterdam 1997

Sexual orientation was included amongst the grounds for prohibiting discrimination at work. In order to ratify the Treaty of Amsterdam, a referendum had to be held to amend the Irish constitution. The Eighteenth Amendment of the Constitution of Ireland amended the constitution in order to allow the state to ratify the Treaty of Amsterdam.

British-Irish Agreement 1998

The British-Irish Agreement provided the legal basis for the Good Friday Agreement. In the Good Friday Agreement, the British government gave a commitment to establish a Human Rights Commission for Northern Ireland. It also committed all public bodies to carry out their duties with due regard for the need to promote equality of opportunity on nine grounds including sexual orientation. The Irish government gave a similar commitment. The Nineteenth Amendment of the Constitution of Ireland allowed the Irish state to ratify the British-Irish Agreement.

Employment Equality Act 1998
Prohibited discrimination at work on a number of grounds including sexual orientation. The act covered aspects such as terms and conditions in employment contracts; promotion and demotion; harassment at work; indirect discrimination; pay and work conditions; membership of unions and professional bodies; and participating in training courses. Mechanisms were put in place to ensure the enforcement of this Act. A person can seek mediation or adjudication with the Equality Authority or go to the Equality Tribunal for a binding ruling which can only be appealed to the courts on a point of law. Under Section 37(1) as enacted, a religious institution that provided religious, educational or medical services enjoyed a broad exemption from this act, allowing religious-run schools and hospitals to take action against an employee or prospective employee in order to uphold their ethos. Since 98% of primary schools and 52% of secondary schools are religious run, this meant that up until 2015 a school could legally discriminate against a gay or lesbian employee. Section 37.1 was amended to narrow the grounds for legal discrimination by the Equality (Miscellaneous Provisions) Act 2015.

Equal Status Act 2000
Prohibited discrimination on many grounds, including sexual orientation, in the provision of services and goods by commercial companies as well as by state institutions such as the civil service and state agencies. It covered a wide area of services such as financial produces–mortgages, savings, loans; access to building and clubs and societies–not be allowed to be told to leave on the grounds on ones sexual orientation from a nightclub etc.; the state through it civil service and its various agencies could not discriminate in matter such as–granting loans or grants to university, providing an individual dole to other social assistant; in terms of renting property a landlord could not refuse to offer accommodation to a gay man or couple or evict them on that basis. The Act also empowered the Equality Authority to monitor and enforce the law regarding equality in both the provision of goods and services and employment. A person can take a case to the Equality Tribunal in the event of discrimination occurring.

Finance Act 2000
Allowed cohabiting couples either same-sex or opposite-sex to apply for relief on Capital Acquisitions Tax on their property in limited circumstances.

Health Insurance (Amendment) Act 2001
This restated the prohibition of discrimination in the provision of health insurance on the grounds of sexual orientation under the Health Insurance Act 1994. This applies to individuals and not same-sex couples.

Implementing Equality for Lesbians, Gays, and Bisexuals 2002
In a wide-ranging report on the situation of gays and lesbian in Ireland, the Equality Authority made many recommendations for change across many areas. Most of its recommendations were non-statutory. It called for all policies of the government departments to be equality proofed on the grounds of sexual orientation. It called for many changes needed to help benefit gays and lesbians for example hospital visits of partners of same-sex couples, provision of services where the provider are ignorant or unaware of the needs of gays and lesbians. It also called on for civil marriage to be widened to also for same-sex couples to marry. It also called on for civil partnership laws to be introduced if same-sex marriage is not allowed.

European Arrest Warrants Act 2003
This act gave legal effect to the EU Framework Decision on the issuing of European Arrest Warrants. A European arrest warrant applies to all of the EU. However, the Minister for Justice can refuse to surrender a person if it is believed that the European arrest warrant was issued in order to punish that person on the grounds of their sexual orientation as well as on other discriminatory grounds.

Civil Registration Act 2004
Placed a bar on the ability of two men or two women from entering into marriage. This reinforced the common law understanding, at the time, that marriage is between one man and one woman. This act allowed for marriages (between a man and a woman) to take place in other locations than a church and a registry office. This bar has since been removed by the Marriage Act 2015.

Social Welfare (Miscellaneous Provisions) Act 2004
This act prohibited unfair discrimination in the provision of occupational pensions on the grounds of sexual orientation. This related to individuals only. This does not make a requirement for pension schemes to pay a death grant to the surviving partner of a same-sex relationship. This has been partially amended with the enactment of civil partnership and the enactment of marriage for same-sex couples. Married same-sex couples and civil partners are in general entitled by law to a death grant from an occupational pension scheme where that scheme does the same for married opposite-sex couples. A same-sex cohabiting couple do not enjoy this protection.

Equality Act 2004
Allows for positive action to be taken in the workforce in order to promote greater equality on all nine grounds as outlined in the act including sexual orientation. It also closes a loophole in regards to harassment whereby a person does not have to have the characteristics imputed to them in a situation of harassment. For example, if a person is subject to homophobic jokes but that person is not gay or lesbian they may take legal action to redress the harassment. Another new provision covers people who suffer from discrimination by association. Such persons can make a case even if they do not fall into one of the nine specific groups which are covered under the legislation. For example, someone who defends a co-work who is gay from harassment could, in turn, suffer from harassment, that person can take a case to the Equality Tribunal. Another development deals with indirect discrimination where a particular measure while appearing neutral on the face of it, has a disproportionate impact on a particular group or individual in the workplace. Companies are required to monitor the impact of their policies on their employers and adjust their policies to cater for different needs of their employees.

Social Welfare Consolidation Act 2005
This act restated the limit contained in the Social Welfare Consolidation Act 1993 prohibiting the granting of social welfare payments to same-sex couples. Some social welfare payments were given to opposite-sex cohabiting couples while more were given to married couples as well as widows and widowers. This has since been changed by the Social Welfare and Pensions Act 2010. (see below)

Criminal Law (Sexual Offences) Act 2006
This abolished the legal concept of buggery under the age of 17 and replaced it with a new offence of 'defilement of a child'. Buggery over the age of 17 had been abolished by the Criminal Law (Sexual Offences) Act 1993. The term 'defilement of a child' was gender neutral and this covered sexual intercourse with any person under the age of 17. Sexual intercourse with a person under the age of 15 carries a penalty of life imprisonment, while sexual intercourse with a person between the ages of 15 to 17 carries a penalty of 5 years or 10 if the person is in a position of authority.

Zappone v. Revenue Commissioners (2006) (High Court)

Katherine Zappone and Ann Louise Gilligan, who got married in Canada and lived in Ireland, took the Revenue Commissioners to court since they refused to recognise their Canadian marriage and for refusing to grant them joint tax assessment. Married couples in Ireland are entitled to have their income jointly assessed as this reduces the overall amount of tax paid. The couple argued that marriage is not defined in the constitution to specify either same sex or opposite sex. They also argued that their rights were being infringed by the lack of recognition of their marriage. The High Court rejected the arguments of the couple. Ms. Justice Dunne did accept that the Irish Constitution does not define marriage as between opposite-sex couples, however, she argued that marriage was traditionally understood to be between a man and a woman and that this understanding of marriage ran through all court cases and legislation about the rights and duties of married couples. Katherine Zappone and Ann Louise Gilligan initially decided to appeal their case to the Supreme Court. However, they decided to change the grounds of their challenge and this required them to issue a new legal challenge in the High Court. In their original case, they did not challenge the constitutionality of the Civil Registration Act 2004 which put into law an impediment on two couples of the same sex from getting married. After the opening up of marriage to same-sex couples under the Thirty-fourth Amendment of the Constitution of Ireland and the Marriage Act 2015, their case became moot.

Options Paper (2006) (Dept. of Justice, Equality and Law Reform)
This was drafted by a working group of former politicians, civil servant and members from relevant NGOs. This working group was established by the then Minister for Justice, Equality, and Law Reform. It was chaired by Anne Colley. This paper examined the various options open to the government in regards to legal recognition of cohabiting couples, both same-sex and opposite-sex. It acknowledged that only the introduction of same-sex marriage would grant full equality for same-sex couples. However, the introduction of same-sex marriage would be constitutionally vulnerable. It recommended that civil partnership be introduced for same-sex couples.

Report on Cohabiting couples by the Law Reform Commission 2006

In this report, the Law Reform Commission suggested a scheme whereby same-sex and opposite-sex couples who lived together for 3 years (2 years if they have a child) could make arrangements or sign a legally binding contract in regards to taxation, pensions, inheritance, custody and other matters between themselves. Married couples automatically have a wide range of rights, protections, and duties under the law. Same-sex couples, who at the time could not marry, and opposite-sex couples who live together but who choose not to marry do not benefit from many of these rights unless specifically provided so by law. There were very few rights at the time conferred by law to such couples. The report did not propose a scheme such as civil partnership as this would prescribe a fixed bundle of rights and duties and would require cohabiting couples to opt-in. Instead, each couple would be free to sign a cohabiting contract that would have the force of law. On the death or break up of a relationship one or both of the parties could apply to court to get various court orders for payment or property if they are economically dependent. The report recommended that cohabiting couples should have the right to opt out of this arrangement but the courts could lay aside this opt-out if it was judged that this opt-out would cause injustice to a former cohabitant. In this report, the Law Reform Commission repeats the recommendations it gave in its previous consultation paper issued in 2004 but the Commission strengthened the recommendations to allow for a wider range of protections especially those affecting pensions and employment law. It contained a draft bill to allow for the legal recognition of cohabiting couples. Almost all of this draft bill was included as Part 15 of the Civil Partnership and Certain Rights and Obligations of Cohabitants Act 2010.

Parental Leave (Amendment) Act 2006
Entitles a person to take  leave which is paid time off work to care for their same-sex partner and to make arrangements to have them taken care off in the event of a sudden illness or in an emergency. This did not cover parental leave which was only available to married couples and opposite-sex cohabiting couples until 2016. See Paternity Leave and Benefit Act 2016.

European Communities (Free Movement of Persons) Regulations 2006
This statutory instrument put into law the EU directive 2004/38/EC. It allows same-sex couples where one person is an EEA national and the other who is a non-EEA national to live in Ireland without the requirement of getting a work permit. The same-sex couple had to be in a relationship for 2 years and the relationship had to be attestable, that is there is proof that the relationship was genuine. This did not cover Irish nationals who were in a relationship with a non-EEA national. In 2008 this loophole was closed and non-EEA national who is cohabiting with an Irish national is not required to get a work permit.

Treaty of Lisbon 2007
The Treaty of Lisbon was signed in 2007 and came into legal effect on 1 December 2009. In order for the Irish state to ratify the treaty the constitution had to be amended and this required a referendum to be held. The Twenty-eighth Amendment of the Constitution of Ireland amended the constitution to permit ratification. The Treaty of Lisbon gives legal effect to the Charter of Fundamental Rights of the European Union. This Charter prohibits any discrimination in the workplace on the grounds of sexual orientation. The Charter is limited in its application to areas of law within the competencies of the EU. It is unclear what consequences this will have vis-á-vis Section 37(1) of the Employment Equality Act 1998 which grants an exemption to religious-run institution to discriminate legally in order to uphold the ethos of their institution.

Foy v. An t-Ard Chlaraitheoir (2007) (High Court)

Lydia Foy was born male and had a gender reassignment operation in 1992. She had sought to get the Registrar General to recognise her change of gender and issue a new birth certificate in her correct gender. The Registrar General refused to do this. Lydia Foy took the state to the High Court seeking an order to compel the Registrar General to issue a new birth certificate. The initial case was heard in 2000 and in 2002 a judgment was handed down. The High Court refused to order the Registrar General to issue a new birth certificate. Lydia Foy appealed the case to the Supreme Court. Meanwhile, a number of other legal developments occurred. In 2002 the European Court of Justice heard a similar case about a transgender woman in the Christine Goodwin v. UK and the European Court of Justice ordered the UK government to recognise Christine Goodwin's new gender and issue a birth certificate. Also, Ireland ratified the European Convention on Human Rights (ECHR) in 2003 and brought its provisions into domestic law. Lydia Foy brought fresh proceedings in the High Court arguing that her rights under the convention were being breached. In 2007 the High Court found in favour of Lydia Foy and declared that Ireland's law was incompatible with the ECHR and ordered that a new birth certificate be issued to Lydia Foy. The state did seek to appeal the case but in 2010 it dropped the appeal and accepted the outcome.

Passports Act 2008

This allowed the Passport Office to change the gender on a passport if a person had a gender reassignment operation. This was a first time in law that transgender persons were recognised.

Criminal Justice (Mutual Assistance) Act 2008

With this act, Ireland ratified a number of international conventions on the cooperation of justice systems concerning the arrest and extradition of criminals within the EU, with the United States, and under UN conventions. The Irish state can refuse to provide cooperation if the Minister for Justice believes that to do so will result in a person been punished on the grounds of their sexual orientation.

McD v. L (High Court) (2008)
In this case, a lesbian couple P.L. and B.M. had a child using sperm donated by J.McD. a gay friend of theirs. They had arranged a contract with J.McD. The role of J.McD. was to act as an 'uncle' to the child but not be involved in the daily life of the child. J.McD. went to court to establish guardianship over the child, as its natural father. The High Court refused J.McD.'s application. The High Court upheld the contract agreed by P.L. and B.M. and granted them sole guardianship and custody of the child at the centre of the case. Significantly the High Court acknowledged the lesbian couple and their child as a de facto family who enjoyed the rights granted to families under Article 8 of the European Convention on Human Rights. The judge also called upon the Oireachtas to legislate for same-sex couple who raise children and recognise them as families.

European Communities (Free Movement of Persons) (Amendment) Regulations 2008
This amended the 2006 regulations. It removed the requirement that a same-sex couple with one of the partners being a non-EEA national must have been resident in another member state in order to move to Ireland. This meant that an Irish citizen and his or her same-sex partner could move to Ireland. This change of law came about as a result of the Metock Case which was decided at the European Court of Justice.

Health Insurance (Miscellaneous Provisions) Act 2009

This restated the ban on varying health insurance premiums on the grounds of sexual orientation and on other grounds. It is a similar provision to the Health Insurance Act 1994 and the Health Insurance (Amendment) Act 2001.

McD v. L (Supreme Court) (2009)

The Supreme Court reversed the decision of the High Court. McD was not granted guardianship over the child as its natural father. The Supreme Court held that the family based on marriage was the only family type that is given constitutional recognition and thus refused to recognise the lesbian couple in this case as a family.

Civil Partnership and Certain Rights and Obligations of Cohabitants Act 2010

The Civil Partnership and Certain Rights and Obligations of Cohabitants Act 2010 allows for same-sex couples to enter a civil partnership on the same terms as married couples. The act deals with a number of areas such as succession of property, pension entitlements, domestic violence, and maintenance in the event of a breakdown of a relationship. The social welfare benefits and the tax entitlements of civil partners were dealt with in other pieces of legislation (see the Social Welfare and Pensions Act 2010 and the Finance (No. 3) Act 2011). The act makes provision for recognition in Ireland of same-sex marriages and civil partnerships performed abroad, however, such unions will only be recognised as civil partners only. The act does not deal with residency of same-sex couples that wish to become civil partnered in Ireland. Civil partners must wait 2 years to get their partnership dissolved. Judicial separation is not allowed. Civil partners were not allowed at the time to adopt jointly through one civil partner was allowed to adopt a child as a single person. Also at the time, civil partners could not have joint guardianship over any children they raised together. This has since been changed under the Children and Family Relationships Act 2015. The first public civil partnerships took place in April 2011. With the passing of the marriage equality referendum, the law has changed and same-sex couples cannot now enter a civil partnership. See Marriage Act 2015.

The act also provides for legal recognition of cohabiting couples, both opposite-sex and same-sex, where they have been together for 5 years or 2 years if they have a child in common. Cohabiting couples are able to enter into a legally enforceable written contract where they can arrange their affairs on finance and property. Prior to this act, the courts refused to regard any contract between cohabiting couples as legally enforceable. Where a cohabitation relationship ends on breakdown or on death one or both of the cohabitants can apply to court to get a maintenance order, property adjustment order, pension adjustment order and other such orders that married couples can get when they are separating or divorcing, provided that the person bringing the case is or was economically dependent on the other cohabitant.

Social Welfare and Pensions Act 2010
Under this act Civil partners are treated the same as married couples and are entitled to all benefits that married couples can get. Same-sex cohabiting couples are entitled to claim benefits as a 'Qualified Adult' on the same basis as cohabiting opposite-sex couples. Since the coming into effect of this Act same-sex cohabiting couples will have their income jointly assessed when claiming social welfare. Since 2010 civil partners and married couples have been treated the same under subsequent acts on social welfare.

Finance (No. 3) Act 2011
This act grants civil partners the same tax entitlements as married coupled in income tax, stamp duty (which covers the buying and selling of homes), capital acquisitions tax (which covers the inheritance of property), capital gains tax, value-added tax (VAT) and other taxes and fees. This act covers civil partners only. Same-sex cohabiting couples are not entitled to the same range of tax entitlements and must enter a civil marriage or have entered into a civil partnership to avail of this. Some of the tax entitlements of civil partners have been made retrospective to 1 January 2011 such as capital acquisitions tax and stamp duty. Relief on income tax starts from the date of entry into a civil partnership. Married couples are treated in the same way as they gain relief on income tax from the date of marriage.

Civil Law (Miscellaneous Provisions) Act 2011
This is an omnibus act covering many areas. It amends the Domestic Violence Act 1996. A person who is living or has lived in an intimate and committed same-sex or opposite-sex relationship will be able to apply for a barring order or a safety order. This expands the grounds of relief that a person can get. Previously same-sex couples could only get temporary relief such as stopping orders and interim protection orders. Also, this act will also allow a person to apply for a safety order against a person with whom he or she had a child in common but who have never lived together.

Finance Act 2012

This act amended the tax code to correct some anomalies between civil partnership and marriage. For example, civil partners might have had to pay tax on any maintenance payments where there is a child or other dependent involved due to separation or divorce. Married couples do not have to pay tax in this circumstance.

Protection of Employees (Temporary Agency) Act 2012

This act gives the same protections to persons employed by an agency as to those who are directly employed on a temporary basis. The protections on unfair discrimination on the grounds of sexual orientation and other grounds is the same for agency workers as it is for other employees.

Health Insurance (Amendment) Act 2012

This act prohibits the varying of the terms of health insurance policies or the premiums on the grounds of sexual orientation. This is similar to the Health Insurance Act 1994, the Health Insurance (Amendment) Act 2001, and the Health Insurance (Amendment) Act 2009.

Social Welfare and Pensions (Miscellaneous Provisions) Act 2013

This act corrected very minor anomalies between the treatment of married couples and civil partners.

Courts and Civil Law (Miscellaneous Provisions) Act 2013

This act allowed the press to attend family law cases provided the anonymity of the persons involved is respected. Up until then, all family law cases were held in private. If sensitive personal information is to be shared, the court can refuse the press entry or restrict the publication of any information shared in the court. Information relating to a person's sexual orientation is regarded as sensitive personal information.

Irish Human Rights and Equality Commission Act 2014

This act merged the Irish Human Rights Commission and the Equality Authority together into one body known as the Irish Human Rights and Equality Commission. This act required that as far as possible members of the commission are drawn from the various minority groups including members from the gay and lesbian community.

Freedom of Information Act 2014

This act allows the general public to have access to information and records kept about them by the civil service, state agencies and by private companies. The act allows information on a person's sexual orientation or their civil status (i.e. that they are married or in a civil partnership) to be kept on record and to be shared. The original Freedom of Information Act 1997 was amended in 2003 to restrict the information shared and to increase the charges on members of the press and public in accessing information on record. The 2014 act reversed many of the restrictions introduced in 2003.

Civil Registration (Amendment) Act 2014

This inserted new provisions to prevent civil partnerships of convenience and it allows for civil partnership ceremonies to take place in the embassies of Ireland.

Assisted Decision-Making (Capacity) Act 2015

This act covers married couples, civil partners, cohabiting couples and people in other types of relationships (both intimate and non-intimate) and single people.

Children and Family Relationships Act 2015

This act is wide-ranging in its reform of the law regarding children. It provided for the legal regulation and recognition of donor-assisted human reproduction. It changed the law on guardianship of children. Before the act married parent automatically had guardianship rights over their children and the natural mother had automatic guardianship rights. The natural father did not have automatic guardianship rights although he could go to court to establish those rights or the natural mother could extend those rights to him by statutory declaration. This act automatically gives guardianship rights to natural fathers provided that they have been cohabiting with the natural mother for at least 3 months after the birth of a child in common. It also allows same-sex couples, either in a civil partnership or cohabiting, to apply for guardianship rights over any child they are raising together. It also allows for other relatives of a child such as, grandparents, aunts, uncles to also apply for guardianship rights over a child they are raising. The act changed the law on adoption and civil partners and cohabiting couples (either opposite-sex or same-sex) can apply for adoption after they have been living together for 3 years. The act extends adoption leave to civil partners and to cohabiting couples. This act has been modified by the Adoption (Amendment) Act 2017.

Gender Recognition Act 2015

This act provides for the legal recognition of a person's new gender where they have gone through a gender reassignment operation or are about to go through a gender reassignment operation. A person who has changed their gender can get a gender recognition certificate. This certificate entitles a person to have important documentation changed to reflect their new gender such as birth certificates. In general, a person must be over the age of 18 to get a certificate however an exemption to this can be granted by the courts to a person under the age of 18. A person who wishes to change their gender does not have to go through an exhaustive medical or physiological assessment, rather they need their GP to state that they have gone through a gender reassignment operation or they are about to undergo the operation.

Thirty-fourth Amendment of the Constitution (Marriage Equality) Act 2015

This act amended the Constitution of Ireland to enable the Oireachtas to pass legislation in order to allow two persons, irrespective of their sex, to get married. The constitution was amended by the insertion of Section 4 of Article 41, stating 'Marriage may be contracted in accordance with law by two persons without distinction as to their sex'. The proposal was put to the people in a referendum and it was carried with 60% of the electorate voting, 62% voting Yes and 38% voting No.

Marriage Act 2015
The Thirty-fourth Amendment of the Constitution required the Oireachtas to pass a law allowing same-sex couples the right to get married. The Marriage Act 2015 fulfills this requirement and commenced on 16 November 2015. Same-sex couples who wish to marry will have to give 3 months notice, the same as opposite-sex couples. Same-sex couples who entered a civil partnership will remain in that civil partnership. Same-sex couples who are already in a civil partnership can get married by giving 5 days notice. Should any couple in a civil partnership get married then their civil partnership is dissolved. Same-sex couples who got married abroad have had their marriages recognised from 16 November 2015. Since the coming into legal effect of the Marriage Act 2015 same-sex couples are not allowed to enter into a civil partnership in Ireland. The first same-sex couple to get married took place on 17 November 2015. The situation regarding same-sex couples who enter into a civil partnership abroad since 16 November 2015 is unclear as to whether their relationship will be recognised as marriage or as a civil partnership.

Equality (Miscellaneous Provisions) Act 2015

This act is an omnibus piece of legislation and amends various unrelated laws. This act amends Section 37.1.  Section 37.1 as previously worded allowed a religious institution that provides religious, educational or medical services the right to legally discriminate against their employees in order to uphold their ethos. Given that some hospitals and many nursing homes, as well as 98% of primary schools and 52% of secondary schools, are religious run, then a gay or a lesbian teacher, doctor or nurse could have been discriminated against as their sexual orientation could have been seen to undermine the ethos of the school or hospital. This act narrows the scope of Section 37.1. It requires that any employer who wishes to use Section 37.1 must satisfy three tests. These tests are that (1) religion is a genuine occupational requirement of the position, (2) the action is objectively justified and (3) the means of achieving the aim are appropriate and necessary. Any action to take place under Section 37.1 must be about the conduct of the employee and not about their sexual orientation. Also, employees who work in religious-run institutions enjoy a right to privacy.

European Communities (Free Movement of Persons) Regulations 2015

This regulation transposes into Irish law the EU Directive 2004/38/EC. This provides an updated regulation on the right of residency. The Regulations provide for the facilitation of entry and residence for EU citizens and their family members. The Regulations also provide for a wider definition of "family member", to include a partner with whom the EU citizen has a durable relationship, duly attested, and the dependent parents, children under 21 and other dependent children of that partner. This does not involve the recognition of such partnerships for other purposes.

International Protection Act 2015
A person can claim asylum based on fear of prosecution arising from their sexual orientation.

LGBT Youth Strategy

As part of its programme for government, the newly elected minority government has promised to devise an LGBT Youth Strategy. The strategy is to focus on equality of opportunities, education, preventative health care, and support services. The Programme for Government states ‘We will develop an LGBT Youth Strategy that will encompass education, youth services, mental health and other issues. As part of this strategy, we will review the implementation of the National Action Plan on Bullying in our schools.’ The Minister for Children Katherine Zappone in May 2016 stated that she hoped the LGBT Youth Strategy would be published in one years time.

Paternity Leave and Benefit Act 2016

This extends paternity leave from 3 days to 2 weeks. It allows paternity leave to be combined with maternity leave and adoptive leave in certain tragic circumstances. Same-sex couples are treated the same as opposite-sex couples.

Criminal Justice (Aggravation by Prejudice) Bill 2016

The Republic of Ireland is somewhat unusual in that it does not have a hate crimes law. Ireland does have the Prohibition of Incitement To Hatred Act 1989, which prohibits incitement to hatred but that law is difficult to enforce. It is unclear if there have been any successful convictions under the 1989 Act. Under the Criminal Justice (Aggravation by Prejudice) Bill 2016 if a person is convicted of an offence the courts may determine that that offence was caused by a hatred towards a person and may impose a higher sentence if the courts deem that appropriate. Sufficient evidence will have to be given in the court for an offence to be considered an aggravated offence. The bill does not set out any minimum penalties. The bill names disability, sexual orientation and transgender identity as grounds for an aggravated offence. As this is a private member bill it remains to be seen if it will pass through the Oireachtas.

Modification of the Blood Ban 2016

Ireland introduced a ban on all men who have sex with men from donating blood. It was a ban for life. This ban was introduced in 1985 at the height of the AIDS crisis. The Minister for Health announced that the ban will be eased in light of evidence that has emerged in recent decades. Men who have sex with men will be able to donate blood provided they have abstained from sexual intercourse for at least one year. Men who have a history of sexually transmitted diseases will have to wait for five years to donate. This measure has been welcomed as a progressive step by GLEN (Gay and Lesbian Equality Network) however they note that the new measure still discriminates against men who are in a committed and sexually active relationship. Others have criticised the ban as not based on science and that the deferral period is too long and still re-inforces stigma on gay men and MSM people.

Convictions for Certain Sexual Offences (Apology and Exoneration) Bill 2016

This bill proposes that all men convicted of buggery or gross indecency under previous criminal law be exonerated from their conviction and that they are given an apology. The basis for the exoneration and apology is that it was wrong for the State to have prosecuted men who had consensual sexual acts with other men. The bill goes onto state that the apology and exoneration do not give cause to sue the State nor does it impose a liability on the State. This law does not apply to convictions for sexual acts with minors. If this bill passes into law the criminal records of men who were convicted will not be expunged as there is no facility for this to happen. Such men will continue to have a criminal record despite the exoneration and apology. Some concern has been raised over non-consensual sexual acts between adult men in the past. A motion before the Oireachtas is due on the 25th anniversary of decriminalisation. The Taoiseach Leo Varadkar has stated that there are complications regarding the passing of this bill mainly on how to distinguish cases involving consenting adults and cases involving minors.

Adoption (Amendment) Act 2017

This act legislates for the 31st Amendment of the Constitution (Children) Act 2012. The act allows civil partners and same-sex married couples the right to apply for adoption. Children in long-term foster care can be adopted and step-parents may apply to adopt their spouses' child. Civil partners were given the right to apply for adoption under the Child and Family Relationships Act 2015.

Gender Recognition (Amendment) Bill 2017

This bill proposes to amend the Gender Recognition Act 2015. At present, a person aged 16 to 18 years must receive a court order, parental consent and the intervention of medical professionals before they can be issued a gender recognition certificate after a gender reassignment surgery. Under this bill, a person aged 16 to 18 will be treated the same as a person 18 years or older. It also proposes to amend the procedure for persons under the age of 16 who will normally have to get parental permission to undergo gender reassignment surgery. A court can dispense with parental consent if the court decides that the refusal of parental consent would not be in the best interests of the child. This bill will also empower the Minister for Justice to review the Gender Recognition Act in order to grant gender recognition certificates to persons who do not identify as exclusively male or female after a gender reassignment surgery.

Provision of Objective Sex Education Bill 2018

The purpose of this bill is to require all primary and secondary schools to provide objective and fact-based sex education irrespective of the religious ethos of the school. At present sex education in primary and secondary schools is taught by the Relationship and Sexuality Education (RSE) Programme. RSE was introduced in 1999. Schools can modify the RSE programme in line with their ethos. The existing RSE programme has been criticised as being too heterosexist in nature as LGBT sexuality is ignored. Also, implementation of the RSE programme has been shown to be very inconsistent. This bill will require schools to teach an objective and fact-based sexuality programme that is inclusive of LGBT sexuality and gender issues and schools will not be able to use their ethos to prevent such sex education from happening.

Domestic Violence Act 2018

The purpose of this Act is to amend and consolidate the law in relation to domestic violence. This Act consolidates the provisions contained in the Domestic Violence Act 1996, the Domestic Violence (Amendment) Act 2002 and relevant provisions of the Civil Partnership and Certain Rights and Obligations of Cohabitants Act 2010, the Civil Law (Miscellaneous Provisions) Act 2011, the Courts and Civil Law (Miscellaneous Provisions) Act 2013 and the Children and Family Relationships Act 2015. This Act also includes new provisions which must be enacted in order for Ireland to be able to ratify the Council of Europe Convention on preventing and combating violence against women and domestic violence, more commonly known as the Istanbul Convention. Ireland signed the Istanbul Convention in November 2015. These new provisions include allowing a person to apply for an emergency barring order where that person has lived in an intimate and committed relationship with the respondent without being their spouse or civil partner or where that person is the parent of an adult respondent, and the inclusion of a provision to criminalise forced marriage. This Act also removes the underage marriage exemption in order to help to protect minors against forced marriage, as requiring both intended spouses to be at least 18 should assist in ensuring that potential spouses have the maturity to withstand parental or other pressure to marry a particular person.

Prohibition of Conversion Therapies Bill 2018

This bill will prohibit any counsellor, care worker, teacher, doctor, psychologist and other medical and mental health professionals from seeking to change a person's sexual orientation especially to 'cure homosexuality'. The penalty is a fine of €1,000 to €5,000 or a six-month jail sentence.

Apology for Persons Convicted of Consensual Same-sex Acts: Motion

This motion was passed by the Oireachtas on 19 June 2018. The motion was moved by the Taoiseach Leo Varakadar. The motion apologised to all men convicted under the law that criminalised same-sex acts. The State acknowledges that it was wrong to criminalise and prosecute men. The motion also acknowledged the chilling effected these laws had on the wider LGBT community in creating and fostering social stigma.

Education (Admission to Schools) Act 2018

This act deals with the admission policy to primary schools, post-primary schools, and third level educational institutions. It prohibits educational institutions from refusing a pupil entry on a number of grounds including sexual orientation. It prohibits Catholic-run schools from giving preference to baptised Catholics over non-baptised children. However religious-run schools that are of a minority religion can continue to refuse admission to a pupil if they are not of the same religion of the school. Such minority religions are Church of Ireland (Anglican), Muslim, Jewish and so on. At the moment 89% of state-funded primary school are Catholic-run and 52% of state-funded post-primary schools are religious run. This means that on the religion ground many students could be discriminated against. This has proved to be controversial for students and parents who have no religion and for the Catholic Church. The Act has been commenced and from 1 September 2019 Catholic school may not refuse admission on the grounds of baptism.

Children and Family Relationship (Amendment) Act 2018

This act modifies Parts 2 and 3 of the Children and Family Relationship Act 2015, which have yet to be commenced. Parts 2 and 3 of the principal act deal with surrogacy. This amending bill makes minor technical changes which would allow some families who have conceived their children by surrogacy to gain legal recognition over their children in limited circumstances.

Social Welfare, Pensions and Civil Registration Act 2018

This Act brings into effect many of the social welfare changes announced in Budget 2018. In addition, in a move anticipated by the Minister before the budget, a provision has been inserted in the Act which clarifies the survivor pension rights of same-sex couples.

Some pension schemes only grant a survivor pension to the spouse of an employee where the employee has married his/her spouse either before s/he retired or s/he reached a particular age (e.g. 60). LGBT employees who had retired before the introduction of Marriage Equality in 2015 and who were unable to marry their partners at that time lost the benefit.

A change in the law to benefit older LGBT people was supported by all parties. 
 
The ameliorating provision in the Act provides that if the retired employee was in a committed relationship with a same-sex partner at the time they retired or reached a particular age and then married that partner within 3 years of the enactment of the Marriage Act 2015 they are deemed to be eligible for a survivor pension on the payment of the appropriate contributions. The provision is not retrospective as the committed relationship referred to in the Act is not, itself, recognised as a marriage by the State. (The Act resolves, inter alia, the issue in the David Parris case. The Act has similar provisions for civil partners.

Civil Registration Act 2019

This act has a number of unrelated provisions. One of the provisions is to make technical changes to the law to allow some female couples to have their details registered in the register of births, where they have a child in common. This bill applies only to female couples where they conceive in an Irish fertility clinic using an identifiable donor. Male couples are excluded from this bill as are couples where a person in the relationship is undergoing a gender transition. Same-sex couples who use a donor from abroad or use surrogacy are not recognised.

Parental Leave and Benefit Act 2019

Due to an anomaly in the law, male same-sex couples were not able to receive adoption leave and benefits although they were allowed to apply to adopt children. This law corrects that anomaly. This law gave parental leave to all couples (opposite sex, same sex, married, civil partnered, cohabiting) who have a child by natural means or who are having a child under donor conceived child. Adoption leave is 24 weeks leave from work paid through social welfare in order to allow a prospective parent bond with their newly adopted child.

See also
LGBT rights in the Republic of Ireland
List of LGBT rights by region
Recognition of same-sex unions in Ireland
Homosexuality laws of the world
List of Acts of the Oireachtas

References

LGBT rights in the Republic of Ireland
Laws and reports on LGBT rights in Ireland
LGBT